Jiří Lerch (born 17 October 1971) is a Czech football coach and former player. He made 243 appearances in the Czech First League and its predecessor, scoring nine goals. He won the Czech First League in 1995–96 with Slavia. He played three times for the Czech Republic, making his debut against Slovakia on 8 May 1995.

References

External links
 
 Profile as coach at iDNES.cz

Czech footballers
Czech Republic international footballers
1971 births
Living people
Czech First League players
SK Slavia Prague players
Czech football managers

Association football midfielders